Arani Road Railway Junction is located in Kalambur, Arani in the Tiruvannamalai District.

Villupuram–Katpadi route the city is planned by the central government to connect vai Arani. The railway station has been shifted to Kalambur on the Arani–Thiruvannamalai road. The railway station is the Arani railway station. The station is the third largest railway station in the district, apart from the Thiruvannamalai town and the Arani Railway Junction station. Opened in 1889 for public use. The railway station is well connected to cities like Bangalore, Svandpur, Vellore–Katpadi, Kolkata Howrah, Tirupati, Cuddalore, Pondicherry, Mannargudi, Mayavaram, Kumbakonam, Trichy, Dindigul, Madurai, Chennai Central, Arakkonam and Tiruvallur.

The Tindivanam route from the Nagari city is planned by the central government to connect trains via Arani.

References

Railway stations in Thiruvannamalai district
Railway junction stations in Tamil Nadu
Transport in Tiruvannamalai
Chennai railway division